Attyal District is a district of the Sana'a Governorate, Yemen. , the district had a population of 36,253 inhabitants. Hajrat Shawkan village is in this district.

References

Districts of Sanaa Governorate
Attyal District